Bit Managers, formerly known as New Frontier, was a video game developer based in Barcelona (Spain). It was co-founded by Alberto Jose González, who composed the music for all of their games except Bang!, a coin-operated arcade machine.

History

The company was founded in 1988 as "New Frontier", initially programming games for ZX Spectrum, Amstrad CPC and MSX computer systems. The company at first met with only modest success. In 1992, the company changed its name to Bit Managers and began to make games for Nintendo consoles (especially for Game Boy). It focused on creating innovative games based on Franco-Belgian comics such as Asterix, The Smurfs or The Adventures of Tintin for a client company, Infogrames.

In 1997, Bit Managers was chosen by Acclaim Entertainment to develop some game of the Turok series for Game Boy. In 1998, the year of the launch of Game Boy Color, Bit Managers was the first third-party developer to finish two Game Boy Color titles (Turok 2 and Sylvester & Tweety).

That same year, the company was bought by a Spanish arcade video gaming company Gaelco. Bit Managers also ported the Gaelco arcade game Radikal Bikers to PlayStation shortly afterward.

In 2001, the former principals of Bit Managers re-purchased the company. Bit Managers continued their relationship with Infogrames, developing several games for Game Boy Advance.

In 2005, the Spanish video game company Virtual Toys, bought Bit Managers. That business relationship continues and Bit Managers is a subsidiary of Virtual Toys Barcelona.

Games

Bang!
Bang! is a wild west shoot 'em up game created for the Gaelco GG-1v machine, and released by Gaelco in 1998. It featured cartoon graphics; single-player and 2-player modes, and offered the use of a light gun and control button inputs.

References

External links
 Bit Managers website
 Virtual Toys website

Defunct video game companies of Spain
Video game companies established in 1988
Video game companies disestablished in 2005
Video game development companies